St Mary's Church lies between the village of Rostherne and Rostherne Mere in Cheshire, England.  The church is recorded in the National Heritage List for England as a designated Grade I listed building.  It is an active Anglican parish church in the diocese of Chester, the archdeaconry of Macclesfield and the deanery of Knutsford.  Its benefice is united with that of Holy Trinity, Bollington.

History

Little is known about the early history of the church.  There is no reference to a church at Rostherne in the Domesday Book but a deed dated 1188 states that a church had been built and endowed on the site. A steeple was built in 1533. In 1666 there was an inscription on the south side of the tower seeking prayers for the soul of William Hardwick and for his Parishioners. The steeple collapsed in November 1741 after some years' deterioration and neglect.  The present tower was erected and the body of the church which had been damaged by the fall was rebuilt between 1742 and 1744, the architect being John Rowson.  The chancel and north vestry date from 1888 and are by Sir Arthur Blomfield.  The south porch dates from around 1886. The restoration of the church was commissioned in 1888 by Wilbraham Egerton, 1st Earl Egerton in memory of his father, Baron Egerton.

Architecture

Exterior
The tower and church are built in sandstone with a slate and lead roof.  The tower is to the west, there is a nave of four bays with side aisles, a chancel of four bays with side chapels, and a vestry.  The tower is in three diminishing stages with a clock face on the south side.  The bell openings are Venetian in type.  The parapet curves upwards at the corners with vases on the corners and in the middle of the sides.  Unusually the roof of the nave has dormer windows. The church is Perpendicular in style, other than the north doorway and the west window in the vestry which have Decorated features.

Interior
The interior of the church has a mixture of Gothic and classical styles.  In the chancel is the recumbent effigy of a knight dating from around the reign of Henry III which came to light as a result of the fall of the tower in 1741.  Elsewhere in the church is the freestanding memorial to Charlotte Lucy Beatrix Egerton who drowned in Rostherne Mere on the eve of her wedding in 1845. It is by Richard Westmacott Jr. and depicts Charlotte lying on her side with an angel stooping over her.  Also in the church is a wall monument to Samuel Egerton by John Bacon dated 1792.  This is made from variegated white and grey marble and includes high relief figures representing Hope and Patience.  Also by Bacon is a monument to Jonas Langford Brooke, who died in 1784. Elsewhere in the church are other monuments and memorials to the Egerton family, and to the Venables, Cholmondeley, Leigh and Brooke families.

The organ was built in 1906 by A. Young, and was reconstructed between 1970 and 1979 by Sixsmith.  There is a ring of six bells, the oldest of which date from 1630 and 1655.  The other four were cast by Rudhall of Gloucester in 1717, 1771, 1782 and 1785.  The parish registers begin in 1595 and the churchwardens' accounts in 1673.

External features

Outside the church is a lych gate dating from 1640 which Richards considers to be the best example in Cheshire.  It has a self-closing mechanism to keep animals out of the churchyard.  In the churchyard is a sundial dating from around 1730 which is listed at Grade II.  Also listed at Grade II is the ashlar sandstone Simpson tomb dating from around 1831.  In addition the churchyard contains the war graves of five soldiers of World War I.

In popular culture
The 2022 Christmas special episode of Inside No. 9, "The Bones of St Nicholas", was filmed in its entirety in the church.

See also

Grade I listed buildings in Cheshire East
Grade I listed churches in Cheshire
Listed buildings in Rostherne

References

Church of England church buildings in Cheshire
Grade I listed churches in Cheshire
English Gothic architecture in Cheshire
Neoclassical architecture in Cheshire
Diocese of Chester
Neoclassical church buildings in England